Shahid Mofateh Metro Station is a station on Isfahan Metro Line 1. The station opened on 15 October 2015. It is located at Baharestan Boulevard, at Malekshahr in northern Isfahan. The next station on the west side is Golestan Station and on the east side Shahid Alikhani Station.

References

Isfahan Metro stations
Railway stations opened in 2015